Hard Knocks is a reality sports documentary television series produced by NFL Films and HBO.
The show was first broadcast in 2001, and the current 2022 season is the 17th and 18th. Each season, it follows a National Football League (NFL) team through its training camp and covers the team's preparation for the upcoming football season. Starting with the 2021 season there will be an in season version of Hard Knocks following a different team than the training camp version.

The series shows the personal and professional lives of the players, coaches and staff, including their family life, position battles, and even inside jokes and pranks.  It particularly focuses on rookies' adjustments to playing in the NFL, usually with emphasis on the team's most recent top draft pick.  It usually also chooses to focus on undrafted and journeyman players who are attempting to make the team.

The NFL and HBO have called Hard Knocks "the first sports-based reality series" in television history.

Production

The series was created by Marty Callner in 2001.

The series has been narrated by Liev Schreiber since 2001, with the only exception being the 2007 season which was narrated by Paul Rudd, a fan of the Kansas City Chiefs.

The San Francisco 49ers, Atlanta Falcons, Seattle Seahawks, Houston Texans, and Washington Redskins each declined to be the show's featured team for the 2013 season, while the Cincinnati Bengals accepted, marking their second appearance on the show. NFL Commissioner Roger Goodell subsequently said that he wanted more teams to be featured on the series, on "some kind of formal rotation."

Despite the difficulty each year in finding a team willing to participate, NFL Films announced on July 18, 2013, that it had signed a "multiyear" contract extension with HBO to continue producing the show.

In October 2013 the NFL announced that, in the absence of a team volunteering to participate in Hard Knocks, the league could force a team to participate. Teams are exempt from being forced to participate in three circumstances: (1) they have appeared in the past ten years, (2) they have a first-year head coach, or (3) they reached the playoffs in either of the two preceding seasons. The first two teams to appear after such ruling announced were the Falcons and the Texans, appearing on the series in 2014 and 2015 respectively, after both teams declined to appear in 2013. In the Texans case, their appearance in 2015 was eligible for a "forced" appearance, as they had missed the playoffs the previous two years and were entering the second season of then-head coach Bill O'Brien.

In September 2021, NFL Network announced that the Indianapolis Colts would become the subject of the first ever in-season edition of the series. The series premiered in November 2021 and would have carried on through the 2021-2022 NFL playoffs, which the Indianapolis Colts did not qualify for.

Seasons

Baltimore Ravens (2001)

Some of the issues covered in the 2001 Ravens season include:
The team looking to repeat as Super Bowl winners.
Rookies Todd Heap and Dwayne Missouri's adjustment to professional football.
The team's adjustment after a season-ending injury to Jamal Lewis.
The veterans on the team in the final years of their careers (Shannon Sharpe, Rod Woodson, Qadry Ismail, and Tony Siragusa).
The quarterback competition between Elvis Grbac and Randall Cunningham.
Ozzie Newsome and Brian Billick's management of the team.

Dallas Cowboys (2002)

Some of the issues covered in the 2002 Cowboys season include:
Quincy Carter's pressure to stay the consistent starting quarterback and the acquisition of Chad Hutchinson as a backup quarterback.
Rookie Roy Williams's adjustment to professional football.
Emmitt Smith beginning his final season in Dallas, and his pursuit to become the NFL's all-time rushing yards leader.
Dave Campo heading into his third (and eventually, final) season as Dallas's head coach.
The training of the Dallas Cowboys Cheerleaders.

Kansas City Chiefs (2007)

The series returned on August 8, 2007, featuring the Kansas City Chiefs and their preparations for the 2007 season. It is the only season of the series not narrated by Liev Schreiber. Instead, actor and Chiefs fan Paul Rudd was the narrator.

Some of the issues covered in the 2007 Chiefs season include:
The battle for the starting quarterback job between veteran Damon Huard and second-year player Brodie Croyle following the trade of Trent Green.
Star running back Larry Johnson's contract holdout.
Priest Holmes's attempted return to football after missing all of 2006 after a career-threatening neck injury.
The contract holdout and later development of rookie wide receiver Dwayne Bowe, the Chiefs' first-round draft pick of 2007.
Boomer Grigsby's switch from linebacker to fullback.
The development of rookie defensive linemen Tank Tyler and Turk McBride.
The competition between two undrafted cornerbacks - Tyron Brackenridge and Dimitri Patterson.
Arena Football League star Bobby Sippio's attempt to catch on with an outdoor team.

Dallas Cowboys (2008)

The Dallas Cowboys were chronicled for the second time on the television series' fourth season, which premiered on August 6, 2008.

Some of the issues covered in the 2008 Cowboys season include:
 Cornerback Adam "Pacman" Jones' reinstatement into the NFL.
 Cameron Fegreus (free agent from Woodhaven, Michigan) attempting to make the team.
 Keon Lattimore, a younger brother of Ray Lewis, competing for a job.
 Todd Lowber, a very athletic wide receiver new to the game of football, trying to make the team.
 Undersized wide receiver Danny Amendola competing for a job.
 Rookies Felix Jones and Martellus Bennett adjusting to NFL camp for the first time.

Cincinnati Bengals (2009)

The Cincinnati Bengals season premiered on August 12, 2009.  Its ratings were higher than any previous season of Hard Knocks, and it won two Sports Emmy Awards: one for Outstanding Edited Sports Series or Anthology, and one for Outstanding Post Produced Audio / Sound.

Some of the issues covered in the 2009 Bengals season include:
The battle for the starting fullback position between Jeremi Johnson, Chris Pressley, Fui Vakapuna, and J.D. Runnels.
The injuries of tight ends Reggie Kelly and Ben Utecht, and the adjustment of rookie tight end Chase Coffman to the NFL.
The contract holdout of offensive tackle Andre Smith, the Bengals' first-round draft pick of 2009.
The battle for the starting strong safety position between veteran Roy Williams and Chinedum Ndukwe.
The recovery effort of starting quarterback Carson Palmer from an injury-plagued 2008 season.
The antics and catchphrases of wide receiver Chad Ochocinco (as he referred to before changing his name back to Chad Johnson in 2012).
The development and maturation of wide receiver Chris Henry.

New York Jets (2010)

The New York Jets were chronicled in the series' sixth season.  An official announcement was made on March 25, 2010, and HBO began airing it on August 11, 2010.  It won the series' second consecutive Sports Emmy Award for Outstanding Edited Sports Series or Anthology.  The Jets declined another opportunity to appear in the series in 2011.

Some of the issues covered in the 2010 Jets season include:
The vocal coaching style of head coach Rex Ryan, highlighted by several sound bites that became popular after the season, such as "That's being a jackass!" and "Let's go eat a goddamn snack!"
Cornerback Darrelle Revis's contract holdout.
The battle for the starting fullback position between veteran Tony Richardson, journeyman Jason Davis and rookie John Conner.
Second-year starting quarterback Mark Sanchez's development as the "face" of the franchise.
Kris Jenkins's return after ACL surgery.
Running back Danny Woodhead's attempt to make the team.
Cornerback Antonio Cromartie attempting (and failing) to name all 9 of his children.

Hard Knocks: A Decade of NFL Training Camps (2011)
At the end of July 2011, NFL Films announced it would not be producing Hard Knocks for the 2011 season. No team wanted to commit to the series due to uncertainty with the NFL's labor situation.  A retrospective on the series titled Hard Knocks: A Decade of NFL Training Camps was made featuring clips from every episode made to that point, and including comments looking back on the series from Brian Billick, Shannon Sharpe, Mike Westhoff, and others.

Miami Dolphins (2012)

On May 29, 2012, Miami Dolphins head coach Joe Philbin announced that the team would participate in the 2012 season of Hard Knocks.

Some of the issues covered in the 2012 Dolphins season include:
The contract negotiation of Ryan Tannehill, followed by his development as a rookie quarterback in the NFL.
The quarterback position battle between Matt Moore, David Garrard and Ryan Tannehill, with Tannehill winning the starting job after week 2 of the pre-season.
The health issues of David Garrard, especially after undergoing knee surgery during training camp. He was released from the team the same day this season's final episode aired.
The difficulty of Les Brown in adjusting from former college basketball player to NFL tight end, and his subsequent release from the team.
The meeting in which Philbin informs Chad Johnson (formerly Chad Ochocinco) of his release from the team following his arrest for allegedly headbutting his wife of 41 days.
The meeting in which general manager Jeff Ireland informs cornerback Vontae Davis that he was traded to the Indianapolis Colts for two future draft picks.

Cincinnati Bengals (2013)

The Cincinnati Bengals were featured in the 2013 season, which was the team's second appearance on the show.  The first episode of the season premiered on August 6, 2013.

Some of the issues covered in the 2013 Bengals season include:
Rookie defensive tackle Larry Black's season-ending injury
Linebacker James Harrison's dislike of the camera crew at training camp
 The back-up quarterback position battle between Josh Johnson and John Skelton
 Estonian rookie defensive end Margus Hunt's adjustment to the NFL and life in the U.S.
 The fullback position battle between veteran John Conner and converted tight end Orson Charles
 The linebacker position battle between undrafted rookies Jayson DiManche and Bruce Taylor.
 Linebacker Aaron Maybin's struggle to stay on the team and his pursuit of painting.

Atlanta Falcons (2014)

On June 12, 2014, the Atlanta Falcons announced that the team would participate in the 2014 season of Hard Knocks premiering on August 5, 2014.

Some of the issues covered in the 2014 Falcons season include:
 The Falcons attempt to build more toughness into the team after a disappointing 2013 season. 
 Veteran Kroy Biermann's attempt to return from a major injury and switch positions. 
 Rookies Tyler Starr and Jacques Smith's attempt to make the team.

Houston Texans (2015)

On May 27, 2015, it was announced the Houston Texans would be the team featured for the 2015 season premiering on August 11, 2015.

Some of the issues covered in the 2015 Texans season include:
 Head coach Bill O'Brien trying to lead the team to the playoffs after finishing just short in 2014.
 The quarterback battle between Ryan Mallett and Brian Hoyer.
 Vince Wilfork bringing leadership and experience to Houston.
 J.J. Watt working out to Fort Minor's Remember The Name
 Jadeveon Clowney returning from a torn meniscus.
 Reigning Defensive Player of the Year J. J. Watt trying to become an even better player.
 Rookies Kevin Johnson and Jaelen Strong adjusting to life in the NFL.
 David Quessenberry recovering from cancer.
 Charles James, Kourtnei Brown, and Uzoma Nwachukwu try to make the team.

Los Angeles Rams (2016)

On March 23, 2016, it was announced the Los Angeles Rams would be the team featured for the 2016 season premiering on August 9, 2016.

Some of the issues covered in the 2016 Rams season include:
 The team moving back to Los Angeles after spending 21 years in St. Louis
 Head coach Jeff Fisher releasing the previous season's starting quarterback Nick Foles over the telephone
 First overall draft pick Jared Goff's first experiences in the NFL
 Eric Kush fighting for a spot on the roster
 William Hayes' unconventional beliefs about the existence of mermaids and dinosaurs.

Tampa Bay Buccaneers (2017)

On April 19, 2017, it was announced the Tampa Bay Buccaneers would be the team featured for the 2017 season premiering on August 8, 2017.

Cleveland Browns (2018)

On May 17, 2018, it was announced the Cleveland Browns would be the team featured for the 2018 season premiering on August 7, 2018.

Some of the issues covered in the 2018 Browns season include:
 First overall draft pick Baker Mayfield adjusting to life in the NFL.
 Josh Gordon returning to training camp for the first start since his second substance abuse policy violation in 2014.
 Hue Jackson trying to retain his position as head coach and win games after just one victory over the last two seasons.
 Jarvis Landry assuming responsibility as a leader on the team.
 Corey Coleman's dissatisfaction with his role on offense and subsequent trade to the Buffalo Bills
 Rookie Antonio Callaway being unable to avoid run-ins with the law.
 Journeymen Devon Cajuste and Nate Orchard trying to make the team.
 Carl Nassib's finance lessons.
 Rookie quarterback Brogan Roback trying to make the team.

Oakland Raiders (2019)

On June 11, 2019, it was announced the Oakland Raiders would be the team featured for the 2019 season premiering on August 6, 2019.

Some of the issues covered in the 2019 Raiders season include:
 With the construction of Allegiant Stadium and in a usable state by 2020, this will be the 25th and final season in the team's second tenure in Oakland.
 Antonio Brown's recovery from frostbitten feet and his arbitration with the NFL regarding a grievance with the league's new helmet rules.
 The return of Richie Incognito.
 The backup quarterback competition between Mike Glennon and Nathan Peterman.

Los Angeles Rams and Los Angeles Chargers (2020)

On April 7, 2020, it was announced that the Los Angeles Rams and Los Angeles Chargers had volunteered to be featured for the 2020 season. It marked the first time two teams were featured, with both teams set to play their inaugural seasons at the new SoFi Stadium. Before the Rams and Chargers volunteered, the Pittsburgh Steelers were heavy favorites to appear due to the team's national appeal and rare position to be "forced" onto the series; the Steelers themselves have long opposed being featured.

On June 18, 2020, it was announced that the 2020 season would premiere on August 11, 2020. The format of the episodes was set to be different, on account of the NFL's cancellation of preseason games due to the COVID-19 pandemic.

Dallas Cowboys (2021) 

On July 2, 2021, it was announced that the Dallas Cowboys would be the team featured for the 2021 season premiering on August 10, 2021.

Indianapolis Colts (2021)

On September 16, 2021, it was announced that the Indianapolis Colts would become the first team to be featured during the regular season.

Detroit Lions (2022)

On March 28, 2022, it was announced that the Detroit Lions would be the team featured for the upcoming 2022 season premiering on August 9, 2022.

Arizona Cardinals (2022)

On May 23, 2022, the Cardinals were announced as the next In Season team, to premier on November 9, 2022.

Similar productions

Inside Training Camp: Jaguars Summer

In 2004, NFL Films produced a training camp documentary series, similar to Hard Knocks, that featured the Jacksonville Jaguars.  Called Inside Training Camp: Jaguars Summer, it aired on the NFL Network, not HBO, and was narrated by frequent NFL Films narrator Robb Webb.

Some of the issues covered in this 2004 series include:
Jack Del Rio's second season as a head coach
The development of rookie wide receiver Reggie Williams, the Jaguars' first-round draft pick of 2004
The relationship between rookie placekicker Josh Scobee and legendary special teams coach Pete Rodriguez

References

External links

2001 American television series debuts
2000s American documentary television series
2010s American documentary television series
2000s American reality television series
2010s American reality television series
HBO original programming
HBO documentary films
American sports television series
National Football League television series
Documentary television series about sports
NFL Films
Baltimore Ravens
Dallas Cowboys
Jacksonville Jaguars
Kansas City Chiefs
HBO Sports
Cincinnati Bengals
New York Jets
English-language television shows
Miami Dolphins
2020s American reality television series
2020s American documentary television series